Polyporus ianthinus is a species of fungus in the family Polyporaceae. Found in Brazil, it was described as new to science in 2004 by mycologists Tatiana Baptista Gibertoni and Leif Ryvarden.

References

External links

Fungi described in 2004
Fungi of Brazil
ianthinus
Taxa named by Leif Ryvarden